Cupid's in Fashion is the ninth album by the Average White Band (also AWB), a Scottish funk and R&B band. It was released in 1982 on the RCA label and peaked at #49 in the R&B album charts.

Track listing

Side 1
"You’re My Number One" (Dan Hartman)
"Easier Said Than Done" (Kashif)
"You Wanna Belong" (Roger Ball, Vivian Cherry)
"Cupid’s in Fashion" (Hamish Stuart, Alan Gorrie, Roger Ball, White)
"Theatre of Excess" (Alan Gorrie, White)

Side 2
"I Believe" (Keith Forsey, Harold Faltermeyer)
"Is it Love That You’re Running From" (Alan Gorrie)
"Reach Out I'll Be There" (Holland-Dozier-Holland)
"Isn’t it Strange" (Hamish Stuart, Ned Doheny)
"Love’s a Heartache" (Ned Doheny)

Personnel
Average White Band
Alan Gorrie – lead vocals, bass, guitar and keyboards
Hamish Stuart – lead vocals, guitar and bass
Roger Ball – keyboards and alto saxophone
Steve Ferrone – drums
Malcolm Duncan – tenor saxophone and flute
Onnie McIntyre – guitar and vocals

Additional musicians
Jeff Bova – synthesiser
Randy Brecker – trumpet and flugelhorn
Dan Hartman – piano and background vocals
Sammy Figueroa – percussion
Mark Gray – synthesiser solo on “Love’s a Heartache”
Joe Melotti – background vocals on “Cupid’s in Fashion”
Richie Stotts – guitar sound effect on “Theatre of Excess”
Robert Ball – horn and synthesiser arrangements
Alan Gorrie and Hamish Stuart – vocal arrangements

Production
Producer: Dan Hartman
Recorded at Sigma Sound Studios, New York
Engineers: Mike Hutchinson, Jay Mark and Don Hartman
Assistant Engineer: Glenn Rosenstein
Additional Recording at The Schoolhouse, Westport
Album Art Direction/Design: Mike Doud of Larchmont Photography
Album Photography: Jules Bates of Artrouble

References

1982 albums
RCA Records albums
Average White Band albums
Albums produced by Dan Hartman